Intisar-Ul-Haque (20 October 1935 – 4 August 1996) was a Pakistani philosopher.
He served as the chairman of the Department of Philosophy, at University of Peshawar and held the postdoctoral Alexander von Humboldt Senior Fellowship, Germany 1974–76, and Senior Fulbright Fellowship 1984-85. 
He was the first student from Pakistan to do his Ph.D. in analytical philosophy and logic from Edinburgh in 1966. 

Intisar-Ul-Haq served as the chairman and professor at the philosophy department of the University of Peshawar for over 3 decades. He remained very active in research on analytical philosophy. He was a fellow of the Alexander von Humboldt Foundation of Germany.

Early life 

Intisar-Ul-Haque was born in October 1935. He got his master's degree from Lahore and did his B.A. honours from University of London in 1961. He later went to the University of Edinburgh where he completed his Ph.D. in analytical philosophy. He joined Peshawar University and continued to teach there till his death.

Achievements 

Intisar-ul-Haque, former head of the department of Peshawar University, wrote several books and articles on Philosophy and Logic. His books "Philosophy of Religion" and "Logical paradoxes" attracted international reviews. His writings on technical topics as logical paradoxes, theory of perception and philosophy of logic are still used in Postgraduate level in the country. He also has 40 articles published in international journals of repute to his credit. Dr. Intisar was the member of the curriculum committee of the UGC where he influenced the development of curricula in area of logic and philosophy. He was responsible for establishing teaching of analytical philosophy and logic in the country through Pakistan Philosophical Congress of which he was the serving Vice President at the time of his death. 

Intisar-ul-Haque represented Pakistan at an international conference in Thailand of UNESCO. He remained affiliated with the University of Massachusetts as a senior Fulbright Fellow. He was chosen as the Alexander Humboldt Fellow of the prestigious Humboldt Foundation of Germany. He also had the privilege of working with some of the famous 20th century philosophers such as A.J Eyer and PF Strawson. He remained in contact with American logician Irving M. Copi for guidance. 
Dr. Intisar's prime areas of interest included Logic, Philosophy of Logic and Analytical Philosophy.

Intisar-ul-Haque had command over English, Arabic, German and Persian languages. He was compiling an English-Arabic-German dictionary which he had completed up to the alphabet 'M' at the time of his death.

References 

1935 births
1996 deaths
Alumni of the University of Edinburgh
Academic staff of the University of Peshawar
20th-century Pakistani philosophers